Flaviopolis, or Phlaouiopolis, or Flavias, was a town of ancient Cilicia. Respecting its history scarcely anything is known, and it cannot be ascertained whether it owed its name to the emperor Vespasian, or to some member of the family of Constantine. In later times it was the see of a Christian bishop. 

Its site is located near Kadirli in Asiatic Turkey.

References

Populated places in ancient Cilicia
Former populated places in Turkey
Roman towns and cities in Turkey
Populated places of the Byzantine Empire
History of Mersin Province